Viktoria Carlerbäck (born 27 January 1973) is a Swedish equestrian. She competed in two events at the 2008 Summer Olympics.

References

External links
 

1973 births
Living people
Swedish female equestrians
Olympic equestrians of Sweden
Equestrians at the 2008 Summer Olympics
People from Borås
Sportspeople from Västra Götaland County